N113 may refer to:
 Scania N113, a city bus which was first built in 1988
 N-113 road (Spain), a road connecting the Sierra del Moncayo and the N-122 15 km east of Tarazona
 N 113, one of the most prominent star-forming regions of the Large Magellanic Cloud